Saldes is a municipality in the comarca of the Berguedà in Catalonia, Spain. It is situated at the foot of the Pedraforca mountain in the north of the comarca. Deposits of lignite are extracted commercially. The village is linked to Guardiola de Berguedà by a local road. The monastery Sant Sebastià del Sull is located in Saldes.

Demography

References

 Panareda Clopés, Josep Maria; Rios Calvet, Jaume; Rabella Vives, Josep Maria (1989). Guia de Catalunya, Barcelona: Caixa de Catalunya.  (Spanish).  (Catalan).

External links 
Official website 
 Government data pages 

Municipalities in Berguedà